The District of Milan was one of the four divisions of the , the province of Milan during the Napoleonic Italian Republic. It received the numeral I and its capital was Milan. Founded on May 13, 1801, it had a population of 217,807 inhabitants.

Communes
It was composed by the communes of Milan, Holy Bodies of Milan
 Affori
 Arcagnano
 Arese
 Assago
 Assiano
 Baggio
 Balbiano
 Balsamo
 Baranzate
 Bazzana Sant'Ilario
 Bazzanella
 Bescapè
 Bicocca e Bicocchino
 Binzago
 Boldinasco
 Bolgiano
 Bollate
 Bovisio
 Bresso
 Briavacca
 Brusuglio
 Bruzzano
 Buccinasco
 Bustighera
 Cannobio
 Carpianello
 Carpiano
 Casiglio
 Cassignanica
 Cassina Aliprandi
 Cassina Amata
 Cassina de' Gatti
 Cassina del Donato
 Cassina del Pero
 Cassina nuova
 Cassina Nuova
 Cassina Pertusella
 Cassina Savina
 Cassina Triulza
 Cassino Scanasio
 Castel Lambro
 Castellazzo d'Arconate
 Cavajone
 Cerchiate
 Cerro al Lambro
 Cesano Boscone
 Cesano Maderno
 Cesate
 Chiaravalle
 Cinisello
 Civesio
 Cologno Monzese
 Colturano
 Cormano
 Cornaredo
 Cornegliano
 Corsico
 Crescenzago
 Cusago
 Cusano Milanino
 Dergano e Derganino
 Desio
 Dugnano
 Fagnano
 Figino
 Fizzonasco
 Foramagno
 Garbagnate Milanese
 Garegnano Marcido
 Gorla
 Grancino
 Gudo Gambaredo
 Incirano
 Lambrate
 Lampugnano
 Limbiate
 Limito
 Linate superiore ed inferiore
 Liscate
 Locate
 Loirano
 Lorenteggio
 Lucino
 Macconago
 Maccherio
 Mangialuppo
 Masciago
 Mazzo
 Mediglia
 Melegnano
 Mercugnano
 Mezzano
 Mezzate
 Monte
 Monzoro
 Morsenchio
 Muggiano
 Muggiò
 Musocco
 Niguarda
 Nosedo
 Nova
 Novate Milanese
 Novegro
 Opera
 Paderno Dugnano
 Pairana
 Palazzuolo
 Pantanedo
 Pantigliate
 Pedriano
 Peschiera Borromeo
 Pieve Emanuele
 Pinzano
 Pioltello
 Pizzabrasa
 Poasco
 Ponte Sesto
 Precentenaro
 Precotto
 Premenugo
 Quarto Cagnino
 Quinto de' Stampi
 Quinto Romano
 Quinto Sole
 Rancate
 Redecesio
 Riozzo
 Robbiano
 Rodano
 Romanobanco
 Romano Paltano
 Ronchetto presso Corsico
 Roserio
 Rovagnasco
 Rovido
 Rozzano
 San Donato Milanese
 San Giuliano Milanese
 San Gregorio vecchio
 San Pedrino
 San Vito
 San Zeno
 Sant'Alessandro
 Santa Brera; Segnano e Segnanino
 Greco e Pasquè di Seveso; Segrate
 Seguro
 Sella Nuova
 Senago
 Sesto San Giovanni
 Sesto Ulteriano
 Settala
 Settimo Milanese
 Seveso
 Solaro
 Terrazzano
 Terzago
 Tolcinasco
 Torrevecchia Pia
 Torriggio
 Tregarezzo
 Trenno
 Trenzanesio
 Trezzano
 Triuggio
 Trognano
 Trucazzano
 Turago Bordone
 Turro
 Vajano
 Valera
 Varedo
 Vialba
 Viboldone
 Videserto
 Vigentino
 Vighignolo
 Vigliano
 Vignate
 Vigonzone
 Villa Pizzone
 Villa Rossa
 Villa San Fiorano
 Villarzino
 Vimodrone
 Vizzolo
 Zelo
 Zivido
 Zunico

Sources
 Historical database of Lombard laws (it.)

Former departments of France in Italy
History of Lombardy
History of Milan
Kingdom of Italy (Napoleonic)